Lieutenant-Colonel Ibrahim al-Hamdi (30 September 1943 – 11 October 1977) was the leader of a military coup d'etat in the Yemen Arab Republic that overthrew the regime of President Abdul Rahman al-Iryani on 13 June 1974. After the revolt, he was President of the Military Command Council that governed the country. During his rule, he cemented the central government's control over the country, planned on ending tribal loyalty, and Yemen's medieval social classes by proclaiming all Yemenis as equal.

Early life and career

Ibrahim was born in Qattab, Ibb. His oldest brother said that Ibrahim was one day in his early childhood playing near the pond filled with water with his father Mohammed Al-Hamdi. When he approached closer to the edge and began to touch the water, he saw his image on the surface of the water net pool. Then he mistakenly tried to save his reflection, believing it to be a drowning man because of his childhood innocence, causing him to slide in the pool; luckily some of his family members were there to save him after his stomach filled with water.

In his adulthood - specifically in its infancy- he was an associate for his father, who worked as a judge. His father taught him everything about Islamic law while he was studying in the Aviation College to become a pilot, but did not complete his studies and continued working with his father as a judge in the court of Dhamar in the reign of Imam Ahmed Yahya Hamid al-Din where he raised much controversy and attention.

Then, he became in the era of President Abdullah as-Sallal the commander of the commandos, then the responsibility for the western, eastern, and central provinces in 1972 then he was promoted to become the Deputy Prime Minister for Internal Affairs, then he was appointed to the position of the higher representative Commander of the Armed Forces, then on 13 June 1974 he was an effective member of the officers who ran the white military coup overthrowing the Judge Abdul Rahman al-Iryani in the revolutionary correction movement of 13 June 1974 and handed over all the president's and the members' of the republican council authorities to the military forces which represented in the leadership of the general and senior officers mentioned: Ahmad Ghashmi, Yahya Mutawakil, Mujahid Abu Shawareb, Ali Al-Shibh, Hammoud Pedder, Ali Alilla'a, AED Abu Meat, Ali Abu Lohoum, and added later Abdaziz Abdul Ghani and Abdullah Abdulalim.

Economic achievements

Colonel Ibrahim al-Hamdi led the thirteenth corrective movement. Hamdi aimed to correct the Yemeni revolutionary path, to get rid of a "legacy of decadence." He primarily sought to calm tribal feuds and regional conflicts, which had been prevalent under previous rulers. Thus, security was his top concern. He also promoted financial reforms to put an end to favoritism and bribery. He created committees to implement these reforms, saving estimated tens of millions of Riyals.

Furthermore, he initiated a large infrastructure plan, paving thousands of kilometres of dirt roads, building thousands of schools, and hundreds of clinics and health centres. He encouraged people and many non-local investors to invest in the sections of agriculture and local manufacturing. This period saw rising standards of living and much prosperity.

When al-Hamdi came to power in 1974, North Yemen lacked the most basic services and infrastructure. He created a five-year development plan supervised by a number of committees, which encouraged local communities to contribute “to road construction, school building, and water networks.”
In an unprecedented move, al-Hamdi allocated 31 percent of North Yemen’s annual budget to education. Believing that education was the cornerstone to development and progress, al-Hamdi implemented a free breakfast program for pupils in remote rural areas to increase access to basic schooling.
Moreover, Al-Hamdi made a number of executive decisions during his rule to increase the role of government and promote citizenship and equality. His efforts to eradicate tribal loyalty (including in the military) and establish the rule of law in a country devastated by years of civil conflict were ground-breaking in the Arab world during the 1970s.
Al-Hamdi abolished the Ministry of Tribal Affairs (a body he believed was an obstacle to the country’s economic and social advancement) and established the Ministry of Local Administration. He also restructured the North Yemen army and raised the salaries of military and civilian personnel.

During al-Hamdi’s rule, North Yemen witnessed remarkable economic growth, with the country’s GDP rising from 21.5 percent in 1974 to 56.1 percent in 1977. Its per capita income rose by 300 percent in the same period. Al-Hamdi was also planning to establish more democratic institutions in the country by founding what he called “popular conventions.” The purpose of these conventions was to “prepare the groundwork for eventual elections” in North Yemen, according to WikiLeaks documents.
However, the tribal forces that allegedly conspired with Saudi Arabia against al-Hamdi did not allow his plans for North Yemen to come to fruition. On October 11, 1977, he was assassinated, along with his brother, in his vice president’s house in Sana’a.

It seemed this man had started his presidency path with arduous efforts and assisted by a group of young faces qualified academically to build a modern government based on law, order, and institutions. It was a difficult task but not impossible for a commander collected in his persona the power and the model, plus his culture and excellence through his civilian and military experiences, and what was more important is the honor that observed from his family when he worked as a judge (during his short experience in the judiciary while the absence of his father Judge Mohammed Saleh Al-Hamdi all provisions was ending to between the rivals) so he learned two rules that justice is the base of governance, and the base of governance is the fear of Allah. Thus he has proved his worth as a national leader through several Workers in addition to justice, including:
 Lay a long-term economic plan to develop the country.
 Pay all the government debt and started to loan the World Bank.
 Help in reducing the power of tribes and Saudi backed sheikhs and strengthening the rule of law.
 Put down all military ranks, which amounted to inflation and their holders to satiety providers including his rank to attributed the soldier's and officers lost prestige.
 Prevented the use of government vehicles and military or public institutions cars for personal purposes.
 Increased the salary along with four additional salaries in some occasions like Eid al-Fitr and Eid al-Adha, the anniversary of the revolution and the anniversary of the thirteen of June Movement.

Under Al-Hamdi's administration, Yemen enjoyed the most prosperous economic boom since 1962, as he was responsible for a civil engineering endeavour that would usher in an era of unprecedented economic growth in Yemen's post-Imamate history. More specifically, Hamdi fostered the creation of 'Local Development Associations,' which functioned as autonomous community-based institutions focused on developing local infrastructure. Scholar Isa Blumi notes that while "Able to exclusively access the potential tax revenue under their jurisdictions, the committees created from members of the community could also solicit external funds and loans (almost exclusively drawn from local, non-banking sources) independently of the central state and bank now formally connected to the outside world." In other words, during the 1970s the LDAs did the heavy lifting as far as the development of Yemen's infrastructure was concerned. What is more, the locally driven LDAs protected the Yemeni countryside from an influx of foreign finance capital (disguised as development 'aid' and often tethered to massive usury rates). The LDA system thus preserved Yemen's economic sovereignty until 1978.

Military Achievements

During his rule, Al Hamdi put lots of effort into organising and developing the armed forces. He aimed to build a modern army primarily loyal to the state and not organised tribally. He built up the Yemeni defenses in Bab al Mandab and on Yemeni islands in a plan to counter Israel. He also modernized and expanded the Yemeni navy for the same reason.                                                                                                                    He reorganised the Yemeni army into four main forces:

The Giants forces: These forces were formed from merging the Giants brigade with regular units, as a striking military force in Dhamar governorate. Its purpose was to secure the regime and its commander was Abdullah Al Hamdi, the president's brother
General Reserve Forces: It was formed when the Storm brigade and the Reserve brigade were merged.
Parachute forces: Formed from the Thunderbolt corps, the Parachute corps and the Commando brigade.
Military Police Forces: Formed from the Military Police Corps and the Security Command.

The Yemeni Air Force readiness rates vastly improved during his rule. He tripled the amount of combat aircraft.

Assassination

The former President of the Republic of Yemen, President Ali Abdullah Saleh, stated that the Kingdom of Saudi Arabia was the first supporter and implementer of the assassination of President Al-Hamdi, with the help of a number of Yemeni leaders. Al-Hamdi was assassinated at the house of Ahmad al-Ghashmi with the support of Saudi Arabia. His assassination came two days before his scheduled visit to the South of Yemen to negotiate the unification of the North and South of Yemen at that time. His death cleared the ground for Ali Abdullah Saleh, who sought the immediate reversal of Hamdi's local development agenda. These schemes, which depended heavily on loans from the IMF and World Bank and required the mass liberalization of publicly owned assets, "aimed to install an ethos that equated 'rural development' with the importation of certain technologies and expertise only US corporations could provide."

When the Yemeni Revolution broke out, protesters gathered with the image of the late president demanding for justice and investigation for the death of al-Hamdi.

References

1943 births
1977 deaths
Presidents of North Yemen
Nasserists
Yemeni Arab nationalists
Yemeni socialists
Assassinated Yemeni politicians
Assassinated heads of state
People murdered in Yemen
People from Ibb Governorate
Leaders who took power by coup
Yemeni military officers
20th-century Yemeni politicians
20th-century Yemeni military personnel